The MacDonald River is a tributary of the east bank of the Métabetchouane River, flowing in the municipalities of Métabetchouan–Lac-à-la-Croix and Desbiens, in the Lac-Saint-Jean-Est Regional County Municipality, in the administrative region of Saguenay–Lac-Saint-Jean, in the province, in Quebec, Canada.

Agriculture is the main economic activity in this area; recreational tourism, second.

The surface of the MacDonald River (except the rapids) is usually frozen from late November to early April, however safe circulation on the ice is generally from mid-December to late March.

Geography 
The main watersheds adjacent to the MacDonald River are:
 north side: lac Saint-Jean;
 east side: Couchepaganiche River, la Belle Rivière;
 south side: the Métabetchouane River, L'Abbé River, rivière à la Carpe;
 west side: Métabetchouane River.

The MacDonald River originates at the confluence of two agricultural and forestry streams, located west of Chemin du 4e rang de Métabetchouan–Lac-à-la-Croix.

  first towards the north-west, then towards the west, up to a stream (coming from the south);
  westwards passing south of the village of Quebec, to its mouth, located on the east bank of Métabetchouane harbor which is crossed northward by the Métabetchouane River.

Toponymy 
The toponym "MacDonald River" was formalized on December 5, 1968, at the Place Names Bank of the Commission de toponymie du Québec.

Notes and references

Appendices

Related articles 
 Lac-Saint-Jean-Est Regional County Municipality
 Métabetchouan–Lac-à-la-Croix, a municipality
 Desbiens, a municipality
 Métabetchouane River
 Lac Saint-Jean, a body of water
 Saguenay River
 St. Lawrence River
 List of rivers of Quebec

External links 

Rivers of Saguenay–Lac-Saint-Jean
Lac-Saint-Jean-Est Regional County Municipality